KF Çakllani is a football club based in the village of Pallçisht i Epërm, Bogovinje Municipality, North Macedonia. They were recently competed in the Macedonian Third League (West Division).

References

External links
Club info at MacedonianFootball 

Football clubs in North Macedonia
Association football clubs established in 2015
2015 establishments in the Republic of Macedonia
KF Cakllani
Albanian football clubs in North Macedonia